Rüdiger Lorenz (September 1, 1941 – January 31, 2000) was a German pharmacist and synthesist known for his large collection of analog synthesizers and his prolific output of albums featuring them.

History
Lorenz began his musical education with 5 years of piano lessons as a child, followed by playing guitar in local beat-bands in the '60s. He became interested in electronic music when listening to records using the Moog synthesizer at the end of the 1960s. In 1972, he built his first Wersi organ, followed by various amplifiers and effects boxes. In 1977, he constructed his first synthesizer from an Elektor Formant kit. By the time of his death Lorenz's collection included 38 synthesizers, including three large self-built modular ones. In an interview with SYN fanzine he said his favorite instruments were Korg Polysix, Roland TR-808 and Roland Vocoder.

He was one of the pioneers of the DIY movement, not only building his own synthesizers and effects but creating and distributing his own music label, Syncord Records.

After his death, the copyright was transferred to his son Tim Lorenz who is DJ (Superdefekt/sdfkt.) and, just like his father, produces synthesizer-based electronic music. Furthermore, he has been part of the  Liveband since 2005.

Discography
1981 Queen of Saba (cassette)
1982 Silver Steps (cassette)
1982 Wonderflower (cassette)
1983 Invisible Voices (LP)
1983 Earthrise (compilation)
1983 International Friendship (compilation with several other artists)(LP)
1984 Southland (LP)
1985 The last secret of Poseidon (LP)
1987 Angaria (LP)
1988 Morning of the world (LP)
1990 Fata Morgana
1992 Pazifica
1992 Atoll
1993 Coral Sea
1993 Distant Blue (compilation with Stefan Reinert, Wilfried Müller, Michael Rauch)
1994 Sibiria
1995 Taklamakan
1996 Congo
1997 Ozeana
1997 Personal Spirits 2 (compilation)
1998 Tropica
2015 The Syntape Years 1981-1983 (compilation)

Tracks appear on
1984 On-slaught No.5
1991 Syntonic Waves
1992 Syntonic Waves, Vol.2
1993 Syntonic Waves, Vol.3
1993 Tontraeger Fuer Synapsen Massage 01-02
1994 Syntonic Waves, Vol.4
1995 Syntonic Waves, Vol.5
1995 Schwingungen Radio Auf CD Nr. 7
1995 TFSM 01
1996 Syntonic Waves, Vol.6
1996 Mysterious Neighbour - The Mars Project Vol. II
1998 Schwingungen Radio Auf CD Nr. 40
1999 Schwingungen Radio Auf CD Nr. 45
2009 Electrounique Vol. 5

References

External links
 Official website

German pharmacists
1941 births
2000 deaths